Saipur Airport  is a domestic airport located in Saidpur, Nilphamari, Bangladesh.

Saidpur is a city of Nilphamari district in Rangpur division, and Syedpur Airport is the northernmost airport in country. It has started started journey as a domestic airport in 1979, which now handling roughly 30 flights daily in Dhaka-Saidpur-Dhaka route. The city was established based on the Syedpur railway workshop established in 1870 by the British Colonial regime, which was the major railway workshop for Assam-Bengal railway, Saidpur gradually became an important communication hub for adjoining major district headquarters. The city is the commercial hub for the surrounding districts.

The airport is currently undergoing major upgrades and expansion, and is expecting to serve international flights to Nepal to strengthen trade and tourism between Nepal and Bangladesh. After upgrade this airport intro international It makes this airport is the Fifth international airport of Bangladesh.

Airlines and destinations 
There are currently 3 airlines operating to Saidpur. The airlines operate regional turbo-prop aircraft, namely the ATR 72 and Bombardier DHC-8-400.

Flights to Nepal 
In February 2020, the governments of Bangladesh and Nepal began negotiations to allow Nepal to operate flights directly to Saidpur from Nepal to strengthen the trade between the two countries, and attract tourism. As of March 2021, direct international flights to either Biratnagar or Bhadrapur Airport in Eastern Nepal from Saidpur have been proposed, pending completion of the currently ongoing upgrade and expansion of Saidpur Airport.

Upgrade and expansion
In 2018, The Civil Aviation and Tourism Ministry has started the work for expanding Saidpur Airport in Nilphamari to upgrade it to international standards. For the continuation of expansion work, the ministry has acquired  of land from Saidpur municipality and from Parbatipur upazila of Dinajpur.

Accidents and Incidents 

 On 4 September 2015, US-Bangla Airlines Flight BS-151 inbound from Dhaka, operated by a Bombardier DHC-8-400 registration S2-AGU, sustained minor damage to its right hand main landing gear after it went off of the paved surface while making the backtrack to the terminal after landing. There were no injuries reported from the incident, and the aircraft was able to operate the return flight BS-152 safely after being towed to the apron, with an 8-hour delay. The aircraft was later involved in US-Bangla Airlines Flight 211, which crashed in Khatmandu. 
On 25 October 2017, a Biman Bangladesh Airlines Bombardier DHC-8-400 registration S2-AGR, operating as Flight BG-494 from Saidpur to Dhaka, lost its right main landing gear during the initial take off climb when the wheel separated from the aircraft and fell to the ground below. The flight continued to Dhaka and landed safely after performing a low approach to have the landing gear inspected from the ground.
On 17 November 2021, a Novoair ATR 72 registration S2-AHF, operating as Flight VQ-967 from Dhaka to Saidpur, suffered a failed nose landing gear during landing. No injuries were reported.

References

External links
 Civil Aviation Authority of Bangladesh: Airports

Airports in Bangladesh